Bhabhisa is a village in Shamli district in Uttar Pradesh state, India.

Geography 
The Postal Code is 247775. Some nearby villages are in the same postal code, including Dangrol, Kaniyan, Hurmajpur, Shahpur, Bharsi, and Sunna. The village is chiefly inhabited by farmers who grow wheat, sugar cane and other cash crops.

Most of the land is owned by Jats, who work primarily as Kishans. The Jats are from Jawla Gotra and Budhiyan Khap. The village is accessible from Delhi via Kandhla. The village has two Arya Samaj Bhawan from which the lessons of Vedas are learned. There is a Shaheed Bhagat Singh statue which is the only one in the area and a park. There are one veterinary hospital on main road. There are also three primary schools, one middle school, one Kasturba Gandhi Vidhalaya, one inter-college for girls (Gayatri Devi Kanya Intermediate College) and a BRC office.

Notable people
 Chaudhary Sachin Jawla [Chaudhary Budiyan Khap]
 The Gram Pradhan of Bhabhisa is Master Harendra Singh (2021-2026).

Weather 

References

Villages in Shamli district